Haveli Bahadur Shah Power Plant is a RLNG-based power plant located in Haveli Bahadur Shah, Punjab, Pakistan. It was commissioned in May, 2018.

References

2017 establishments in Pakistan
Natural gas-fired power stations in Pakistan
Energy in Punjab, Pakistan